= Italia. Il fuoco, la cenere =

Italia, le feu, la cendre is a French-Italian documentary film which explores Italian silent cinema. It was directed by Céline Gailleurd and Olivier Bohler.
